The 1956 Chim earthquake was a destructive multiple-shock event that occurred on March 16 in Lebanon along a strand of the Dead Sea Transform (DST) fault system. The epicenter was located in the south of Lebanon in the Chouf District. Six thousand homes were destroyed and another 17,000 were damaged. The number of persons killed was 136.

Tectonic setting
The left-lateral fault zone marks the boundary of the Arabian Plate and the Sinai-Levantine block and consists of multiple parallel faults. As the fault moves through Lebanon and Syria the fault trace follows a restraining bend and splits into several strands that include the Serghaya, Rachaya, and Roum faults, as well as the prominent Yammouneh fault.

Earthquake
A paleoseismic trench investigation revealed that it may have been the source of the twin-shock event.

The twin shocks were separated by less than fifteen minutes with the first event occurring at 19:32 and the second event at 19:43 hours. The initial shock was estimated to measure ( = 5.3) and the second event was rated ( = 5.5).

See also

List of earthquakes in 1956
List of earthquakes in the Levant

References

1956 in Lebanon
1956 earthquakes
March 1956 events in Asia
1956 Chim